Nils Simon Erik Nurme (born November 24, 1982 in Laxå, Sweden) is a Swedish football goalkeeper currently playing for Laxå IF.

References

Swedish footballers
Veikkausliiga players
IFK Mariehamn players
Örebro SK players
Allsvenskan players
Degerfors IF players
Syrianska FC players
Expatriate footballers in Finland
Swedish expatriate footballers
Living people
1982 births
Association football goalkeepers